Sultan bin Mohammed al Numani is the Minister of the Royal Office in the Sultanate of Oman. He is the acting chairman of the Defence Council, so it was he who chaired the extraordinary measures upon the death of sultan Qaboos, and it was he who was entrusted to open his will containing the name of Haitham bin Tariq.

References 

Living people
Government ministers of Oman
People from Muscat, Oman
Year of birth missing (living people)